KZJH (95.3 FM) is a radio station broadcasting a classic rock format. Licensed to Jackson, Wyoming, United States, the station is owned by Scott Anderson, through licensee Jackson Hole Radio, LLC
Anderson had managed the stations since 1990 and hosted on air shifts on KMTN while also covering local news.
Anderson, who also has served as the chairperson of the Jackson Hole Chamber of Commerce, was an elected Jackson, Wyoming town councilperson between 1992 and 2006.

References

External links
Official Website

ZJH
Classic rock radio stations in the United States